The 31st National Film Awards, presented by Directorate of Film Festivals, the organisation set up by Ministry of Information and Broadcasting, India to felicitate the best of Indian Cinema released in the year 1983. Ceremony took place in June 1984 and awards were given by then Prime Minister of India, Indira Gandhi.

Juries 

Three different committees were formed for feature films, short films and books on cinema, headed by veteran director K. Balachander, S. Krishnaswamy and Justice G. D. Khosla respectively.

 Jury Members: Feature Films
 K. Balachander (Chairperson)Sai ParanjpyeM. T. Vasudevan NairGangadhar NaskarMeera LakhiaRaghunath SethMadhuSwapan MullickIqbal MasudMrinalini SarabhaiM. K. Binodini DeviM. Prabhakar ReddyK. K. ShuklaG. G. MayekarMarcus BartleyGautam KaulRaghava MenonJamuna
 Jury Members: Short Films
 S. Krishnaswamy (Chairperson)Clement BaptistaPrakash JhaVinod Mehra
 Jury Members: Books on Cinema
 G. D. Khosla (Chairperson)Vivek BhattacharyaO. M. AnujanSukumar DuttaV. K. Madhavan KuttyArun Khanna

Awards 

Awards were divided into feature films, non-feature films and books written on Indian cinema.

Lifetime Achievement Award

Feature films 

Feature films were awarded at All India as well as regional level. For 31st National Film Awards, a Sanskrit film, Adi Shankaracharya won the National Film Award for Best Feature Film also winning the maximum number of awards (four). Following were the awards given in each category:

All India Award 

Following were the awards given:

Regional Award 

The awards were given to the best films made in the regional languages of India. For feature films in English, Gujarati, Kashmiri and Punjabi language, award for Best Feature Film was not given.

Non-Feature films 

Following were the awards given:

Best Writing on Cinema 

Following were the awards given:

Awards not given 

Following were the awards not given as no film was found to be suitable for the award:

 Best Film on Family Welfare
 Best Lyrics
 Best Popular Film Providing Wholesome Entertainment
 Best Film on Social Documentation
 Best Non-Feature Film on Family Welfare
 Best Feature Film in English
 Best Feature Film in Punjabi

References

External links 
 National Film Awards Archives
 Official Page for Directorate of Film Festivals, India

National Film Awards (India) ceremonies
1984 Indian film awards